Wayne Township is one of thirteen townships in Owen County, Indiana, United States. As of the 2010 census, its population was 1,704 and it contained 813 housing units. The Township Trustee of Wayne Township is Kyle Hall.

History
Wayne Township was established in 1820. It was named for General Anthony Wayne.

Secrest Ferry Bridge was listed on the National Register of Historic Places in 1996.

Geography
The White River defines the township's southern border.

Cities, towns, villages
 Gosport

Unincorporated towns
 Silex at 
(This list is based on USGS data and may include former settlements.)

Cemeteries
The township contains these three cemeteries: Gosport, Little Mount and Little Mount.

Major highways
  Indiana State Road 67

School districts
 Spencer-Owen Community Schools

Political districts
 State House District 46
 State Senate District 37

References
 
 United States Census Bureau 2009 TIGER/Line Shapefiles
 IndianaMap
 Owen County Tea Party

External links
 Indiana Township Association
 United Township Association of Indiana
 City-Data.com page for Wayne Township

Townships in Owen County, Indiana
Townships in Indiana